The Gushan Daitian Temple or Hamasen Temple is a temple in Gushan District, Kaohsiung, Taiwan.

History
The temple was built in 1951 and used as the Kaohsiung City Government office. It was the original location of Shuangye Elementary School.

Architecture
The temple was built in traditional Fujian architectural style with East Asian hip-and-gable roofs. The temple building has three entrances, a front worship hall, a main hall, a rear hall and wings on both sides. The archway of the temple is in Northern Chinese architectural style and the wing rooms in Southern Chinese style. It features a museum which showcases works by master painter Pan Lishui.

Transportation
The temple is accessible within walking distance west of Sizihwan Station of the Kaohsiung MRT.

See also
 Wang Ye worship
 Madou Daitian Temple, Tainan
 List of temples in Taiwan
 List of tourist attractions in Taiwan

References

1951 establishments in Taiwan
Religious buildings and structures completed in 1951
Taoist temples in Taiwan
Temples in Kaohsiung